Baltimore Creek is a stream in Bollinger County in the U.S. state of Missouri. It is a tributary of Little Whitewater Creek.

Baltimore Creek most likely was named after Baltimore, Maryland for unknown reasons.

See also
List of rivers of Missouri

References

Rivers of Bollinger County, Missouri
Rivers of Missouri